The 2016–17 FA Trophy Final was the 48th final of the Football Association's cup competition for teams at levels 5–8 of the English football league system. The match was contested between Macclesfield Town and York City. The final of the FA Vase was played on the same day at the same venue for the second year running. Both matches were televised in the UK on BT Sport. York City won the final 3-2 and became the second club in as many seasons, after Halifax in 2016, to get relegated from the National League and then win the FA Trophy in the same season.

Macclesfield Town defeated Altrincham, AFC Sudbury, Forest Green Rovers, Dulwich Hamlet and Tranmere Rovers en route to the final.

York City defeated Worcester City, Harlow Town, Nuneaton Town, Brackley Town and Lincoln City en route to the final.

Route to the final

Macclesfield Town

York City

Match

Details

References

FA Trophy Finals
Fa Trophy Final 2017
Fa Trophy Final 2017
Fa Trophy Final
Fa Trophy Final
Events at Wembley Stadium
Fa Trophy Final